Marco Zanotti (born 10 September 1988) is an Italian cyclist, who most recently rode for UCI Continental team .

Major results

2010
 9th GP Sakia El Hamra, Les Challenges de la Marche Verte
2011
 Giro Ciclistico d'Italia
1st Stages 3 & 9
 2nd Ronde van Midden-Nederland
2012
 Vuelta a Colombia
1st Stages 2 & 7
2013
 7th Grand Prix Südkärnten
2014
 1st Stage 3b Cycling Tour of Sibiu
 3rd Overall Tour de Taiwan
1st Points classification
 5th Overall Tour of China I
 5th Zuid Oost Drenthe Classic I
 5th Ronde van Zeeland Seaports
2015
 1st De Kustpijl
 2nd Ronde van Overijssel
 3rd Overall Tour of Taihu Lake
1st Stage 5
 4th Ronde van Noord-Holland
2016
 6th Overall Tour du Loir-et-Cher
1st Points classification
 7th De Kustpijl
2017
 4th Overall Tour of Hainan
1st Stage 8
 5th Circuit de Wallonie
 9th Overall Tour de Taiwan
 9th Himmerland Rundt

References

External links

1988 births
Living people
Italian male cyclists
People from Desenzano del Garda
Cyclists from the Province of Brescia